"Fly Away" is a 1975 song written and performed by John Denver featuring vocals by Olivia Newton-John. Released as a single from the Windsong album, "Fly Away" peaked at number 13 on the Billboard Hot 100 chart and spent two weeks atop the adult contemporary chart in early-1976, Denver's sixth number one on this chart.  "Fly Away" also peaked at number 12 on the country chart.

Background
The song is an ode to longing for simpler times and a simpler way of life.  Record World said that "this ballad contains the unmistakable Denver vocal charm with the added bonus of Olivia Newton-John joining in on the chorus." Rolling Stone magazine remarked, "At this point, John Denver albums are as numerous as potted plants in the apartments of these urbanites, and both are symptoms of the same longing. The singer acknowledges his average listener in 'Fly Away'."

Chart performance

See also
List of number-one adult contemporary singles of 1976 (U.S.)

References

1975 songs
1976 singles
John Denver songs
Olivia Newton-John songs
Songs written by John Denver
Song recordings produced by Milt Okun
RCA Records singles
Male–female vocal duets